Seven Islands are a group of seven bar islands on the Cheat River in Preston and Tucker counties in West Virginia.

See also 
List of islands of West Virginia

River islands of West Virginia
Landforms of Preston County, West Virginia
Landforms of Tucker County, West Virginia